"Den glider in" is a song written by Peter Karlsson, acting as fight song for the Sweden men's national ice hockey team during the 1995 IIHF World Ice Hockey Championship in Sweden. Nick Borgen recorded the song with the players, and released it as a promo single. The song has later become popular as played when the home team scores.

The words Den glider in originate from a famous call by Swedish radio reporter Lennart Hyland. During the Sweden vs Canada match in the  1962 IIHF World Ice Hockey Championship, Nils Nilsson scored the final goal into an empty net, sealing the Swedes' 5-3 victory. Sweden would go on to win the entire tournament.

The song also became a Svensktoppen hit, charting between 29 April-6 May 1995, with a first position followed up with a third position.

Sweden reached the final during the 1995 IIHF World Ice Hockey Championship, losing to Finland. This was the Finns' first victory in this tournament. Finnish musician Kirka recorded a new version of the song to celebrate the victory. The composer would have allowed translating the song into Finnish but as the record company refused to give permission for a translation, Kirka sang it in Swedish.

References

1995 singles
1994–95 in Swedish ice hockey
Swedish songs
Swedish-language songs
Sporting songs
IIHF Men's World Ice Hockey Championships
Sweden men's national ice hockey team
Dansband songs